Khwahan Airport   is a private use airport located near Khwahan, Badakhshan, Afghanistan.

See also
List of airports in Afghanistan

References

External links 
 Airport record for Khwahan Airport at Landings.com.

Airports in Afghanistan
Buildings and structures in Badakhshan Province